Tumba Ice Cap is the ice cap covering the western half of Chavdar Peninsula on the west side of Graham Land,  Antarctic Peninsula.  It is situated west of Samodiva Glacier, extending 7.7 km in east–west direction and 4 km in north–south direction, and draining both northwards into Curtiss Bay and southwards into Hughes Bay

The geographic feature is named after the peak of Tumba in Belasitsa Mountain, Southwestern Bulgaria.

Location
British mapping in 1978.

Maps
 British Antarctic Territory.  Scale 1:200000 topographic map. DOS 610 Series, Sheet W 64 60.  Directorate of Overseas Surveys, Tolworth, UK, 1978.
 Antarctic Digital Database (ADD). Scale 1:250000 topographic map of Antarctica. Scientific Committee on Antarctic Research (SCAR), 1993–2016.

References
 Bulgarian Antarctic Gazetteer. Antarctic Place-names Commission. (details in Bulgarian, basic data in English)
 SCAR Composite Gazetteer of Antarctica

External links
 Tumba Ice Cap. Copernix satellite image

Ice caps of Antarctica
Bodies of ice of Graham Land
Bulgaria and the Antarctic
Davis Coast